Bishop Smith may refer to:

Harry Lester Smith (elected 1920), American Bishop of the Methodist Episcopal Church and The Methodist Church
John Mortimer Smith (1935–2019), Roman Catholic Bishop of Pensacola–Tallahassee (1991–1995) and Trenton, New Jersey (1997–2010)
William Angie Smith  (1894-1974), Bishop of The Methodist Church and the United Methodist Church

See also
Archbishop Smith (disambiguation)